Lloyd LaCuesta (born in Honolulu, Hawaii) is an American journalist. He was most recently the South Bay bureau chief for the San Francisco Bay Area TV station KTVU's news division, having worked at KTVU for 35 years. He retired from the position as of June 2012. LaCuesta is of Filipino ancestry.

Career
LaCuesta served in the Army as a broadcast journalist for the American Forces Korea Network. He attended California State University, Los Angeles and San Jose State University (SJSU), earning a B.A. in journalism and political science. He won the Sigma Delta Chi Award for reporting while at SJSU. He received an M.A. in Journalism from University of California, Los Angeles. He worked as a writer for KNX/CBS Radio in Los Angeles and the Los Angeles Herald Examiner, and as a producer for KABC-TV in Los Angeles and KGO-TV in San Francisco. He started work at Oakland based television station KTVU in 1976. He has taught journalism at SJSU and Menlo College.

Recognition
LaCuesta has won six Emmy Awards from the National Academy of Television Arts and Sciences. He received a lifetime achievement award from the Asian American Journalists Association (AAJA) in 2004. He was a president of the AAJA, and is the director of the AAJA's Study Tours Program. He was the first president of Unity Journalists of Color.

References

External links
Interview at San Francisco Chronicle blog
Lloyd LaCuesta on C-SPAN

Living people
American television journalists
American writers of Filipino descent
People from Honolulu
University of California, Los Angeles alumni
People from the San Francisco Bay Area
American male journalists
Year of birth missing (living people)